Miston is an unincorporated community and census-designated place (CDP) in Dyer County, Tennessee, United States. It was first listed as a CDP prior to the 2020 census.

Demographics

References 

Populated places in Dyer County, Tennessee
Census-designated places in Dyer County, Tennessee
Census-designated places in Tennessee